The following is a list of the 20 municipalities (comuni) of the Province of Enna, Sicily, Italy.

List

See also
List of municipalities of Italy

References

 Istituto Nazionale di Statistica

Enna